The 1999 FINA Men's Water Polo World Cup was the eleventh World Cup.

Teams

GROUP A
 
 

 

GROUP B

Squads

Péter Biros
Rajmund Fodor
Tamás Kásás
Gergely Kiss
Zoltán Kósz
Tamás Marcz
Tamás Molnár
Barnabás Steinmetz
Zoltán Szécsi
Frank Tóth
Zsolt Varga
Attila Vári
Balázs Vincze
Head coach:
Dénes Kemény

Alberto Angelini
Alessandro Calcaterra
Roberto Calcaterra
Leonardo Binchi
Marco Gerini
Alberto Ghibellini
Enrico Mammarella
Andrea Mangiante
Francesco Postiglione
Stefano Tempesti
Carlo Silipo
Leonardo Sottani
Antonio Vittorioso
Head coach:
Ratko Rudić

Daniel Ballart
Manuel Estiarte
Carlos García
Pedro Francisco García
Salvador Gómez
Miguel Ángel González
Gabriel Hernández Paz
Gustavo Marcos
Iván Moro
Sergi Pedrerol
Iván Pérez
Jesús Rollán
Jordi Sans
Head coach:
Juan Jané

Preliminary round

GROUP A

Tuesday 28 September 1999

Wednesday 29 September 1999

Thursday 30 September 1999

GROUP B

Tuesday 28 September 1999

Wednesday 29 September 1999

Thursday 30 September 1999

Semi-finals
Saturday 2 October 1999

Finals
Sunday 3 october 1999 – Seventh place

Sunday 3 october 1999 – Fifth place

Sunday 3 october 1999 – Bronze Medal

Sunday 3 october 1999 – Gold Medal

Final ranking

*Hungary, Italy and Spain qualified for the 2000 Summer Olympics in Sydney, Australia. Croatia also qualified, although the team was not even at the World Cup, having finished ninth at last year's World Swimming Championships in Perth, Australia, missing the eight-team cut-off for the World Cup. But by finishing second at the recent European Championship and the fact that Hungary downed Olympic and World Champion Spain 8-4 in the medal semi-final, Croatia claimed the European continental berth.

Individual awards
Most Valuable Player
???
Best Goalkeeper
???
Topscorer
 – 11 goals

References

FINA Water Polo World Cup
F
W
International water polo competitions hosted by Australia